Saint Vincent Seminary is a Roman Catholic seminary in Latrobe, Pennsylvania. It was founded by Father Boniface Wimmer in 1846, who came from Saint Michael's Abbey in Metten, Bavaria, to establish Saint Vincent Archabbey as the first Benedictine monastery in North America. It is the fourth oldest Catholic seminary in the United States.

The seminary was officially established on August 24, 1855, through an Apostolic Brief of Pope Pius IX. Civil degrees are conferred by virtue of a charter granted by an act of the Pennsylvania State Legislature on April 18, 1870. Since 1870 over 300 students have earned the Master of Arts degree and 400 Master of Divinity degrees. More than 2,400 diocesan and religious students have been ordained priests.

Notable alumni 
 The Rev. Monsignor John A. Cippel, priest of the Diocese of St. Petersburg, missionary priest in Africa, and part of the I.P.F. Staff
 The Rev. James Renshaw Cox (1886–1951), priest of the Diocese of Pittsburgh, called the city's "Pastor of the Poor" and 1932 Jobless Party candidate for President of the United States
 The Rev. Monsignor Carl P. Hensler (1898-1984), priest of the Diocese of Pittsburgh, labor activist, co-founder of the Catholic Radical Alliance
 The Rev. Monsignor Paul Lenz (1925- ), Director, Bureau of Catholic Indian Missions (1975-2007)
 Cardinal George Mundelein (1872-1939), Archbishop of Chicago (1916-1939)
 Archbishop Rembert Weakland, O.S.B., (1927-2022), Archbishop Emeritus of Milwaukee
 Bishop René Henry Gracida (1923- ), Bishop of Corpus Christi (1983-1997)
 The Rev. Monsignor Charles Owen Rice, priest of the Diocese of Pittsburgh, social activist, co-founder of the Catholic Radical Alliance 
 Archabbot Douglas Robert Nowicki, O.S.B., ( 1945 - ), Archabbot of St. Vincent Archabbey

References

External sources

External links

Latrobe, Pennsylvania
Universities and colleges in Westmoreland County, Pennsylvania
Catholic seminaries in the United States
Educational institutions established in 1846
1846 establishments in Pennsylvania